UFOs: The Greatest Stories is a 1996 anthology of science fiction short stories and novels revolving around UFOs. It was edited by Martin H. Greenberg.

Contents

1996 books
Martin H. Greenberg anthologies